The Dapingding Tropical Botanical Garden is a garden in Siaogang District, Kaohsiung, Taiwan which is used as a museum of tropical plants and a recreational park.

Architecture
The garden has an area of 9.6 hectares with rich ecological resources and various terrains, such as hills, lowlands and tablelands. The garden features ecology exposition center, green path, observation deck, wood bridges, pavilions, forest education center and four theme areas for exhibition, preservation of tropical plants, ecological education and tourism.

Transportation
The park is accessible east of Siaogang Station of Kaohsiung MRT.

See also
 List of parks in Taiwan

References

Botanical gardens in Taiwan
Geography of Kaohsiung